Aleksander Pürge (born Aleksander Ernst Bürger; 28 August 1887, Tallinn – 2 January 1940, Tallinn) was an Estonian politician, technical scientist, engineer, and military officer (lieutenant).

1920 he was Minister of Roads.

References

1887 births
1940 deaths
Estonian engineers
Government ministers of Estonia
Estonian educators
Technische Universität Darmstadt alumni
Riga Technical University alumni
Estonian military personnel of the Estonian War of Independence
People from Tallinn
Politicians from Tallinn
Burials at Rahumäe Cemetery